Goldstein's toe sign is a feature identified by Dr. Hyman Isaac Goldstein (1887–1954), an American physician and medical historian. A greater distance separates the largest two toes of some people exhibiting Down syndrome or cretinism."

References 

Medical signs
Toes